The New Year Ekiden, (officially the ), is an annual men's ekiden (road running relay) over 100 kilometres which takes place in Japan's Gunma Prefecture on 1 January. The race is a national championship contested between Japan's corporate (business) running teams. There is also an annual championship race for women in Japan – the Women's Corporate Ekiden Championships. The race starts and ends in the city of Maebashi and the course passes through the major cities within the prefecture, including Takasaki, Isesaki, Ota and Kiryu. The relay is divided into seven legs of varying lengths that alternate on a frequent basis. The 2012 race was divided as follows: 12.3 km, 8.3 km, 13.6 km, 22 km, 15.8 km, 12.5 km and 15.5 km. 

Historically, the race was conducted around Kashiko Island in Mie Prefecture at its inauguration in 1957. Over the first 30 years of the competition's life it expanded from an 83 km race to a 99 km one. The 31st edition in 1986 was held around Hikone and the Shiga Prefecture, but the race moved again the following year to its current location of Gunma. At this point the distance was reduced to around 85 km and the full 100 km format was introduced at the 2001 ekiden. The first competition featured 14 corporate running teams and this number steadily increased until 1995, when the entry was limited to 37 teams. The 50th edition in 2006 proved to be an except in this respect, as 43 teams were allowed entry in respect of the five people killed during the East Japan Railway derailment accident on 25 December 2005.

The competition has been broadcast on Tokyo Broadcasting System Television every year since 1988 and there is also coverage on TBS Radio. The main commercial sponsor of the relay race is Yamazaki Baking. It has been claimed that the high TV viewing figures of this meet makes it the central motivating event in the annual calendar for professional runners in Japan.

Participation
Teams gain qualification into the final ekiden race through a series of preliminaries which are principally conducted on a regional basis.  Some qualifying competitions are for both men and women while others are single-sex qualifiers. The Eastern Japan Corporate Ekiden Championship qualifies men's and women's teams. The Kyushu men's qualifying race (Fukuoka City to Kita Kyushu city) is held in November. and others include the Kansai Jitsugyodan Ekiden in Tabe, the Chubu and Hokuriku Jitsugyodan Ekidens in Gero, and the Chugoku Jitsugyodan Ekiden in Sera, Hiroshima.

Although the majority of the competing athletes are Japanese, a limited number of foreign runners are allowed to participate. These runners are mostly Kenyan immigrants and are often the best runners on the team. Companies are permitted foreign representatives on just one of the seven legs. Past Kenyans that have competed at the New Year Ekiden include Martin Mathathi, Josephat Ndambiri and Samuel Wanjiru. Ethiopia's Ibrahim Jeylan is another prominent East African to have competed.

Past results

Stage records

References

Winners and stage records
 全日本実業団対抗駅伝競走大会歴代成績（1～3位） . Japanese Corporate Athletic Association. Retrieved on 2012-01-16.
Course records. . Japanese Corporate Athletic Association. Retrieved on 2012-01-16.

External links
Official website at TBS 

Ekiden
Road running competitions in Japan
Sports competitions in Gunma Prefecture
Recurring sporting events established in 1957
Men's athletics competitions